Seixal is a civil parish in the municipality of Porto Moniz in the Portuguese island of Madeira. The population in 2011 was 656, in an area of 36.37 km².

History
Much like its continental twin, Seixal's name origin came from the abundance of pebbles on the beach.

Geography

It is located on the eastern frontier of Porto Moniz on the border with the municipality of São Vicente. The largest parish in Porto Moniz by area, it extends from the Atlantic Ocean into the interior of Paul de Serra.

References

Freguesias of Porto Moniz